Björn-Erik Sundqvist (born 5 March 1988 in Jakobstad) is a Finnish footballer, who currently plays for VIFK.

Career
He left on 25 February 2011 FF Jaro of the Veikkausliiga and signed with Umeå FC.

References

1988 births
Living people
People from Jakobstad
Swedish-speaking Finns
Finnish footballers
Veikkausliiga players
FF Jaro players
Jakobstads BK players
Association football forwards
GBK Kokkola players
Sportspeople from Ostrobothnia (region)